Abdul Halim Khan is a politician, a Muslim cleric, and an ex MNA from Kohistan, Pakistan. He belongs to the Muttahida Majlis-e-Amal Pakistan party and won the NA-23 (Kohistan) constituency seat in 2002. He holds the view that "girls should not be educated, women should not work unless accompanied by mahrams and 'honour' killing is a religiously-sanctioned practice", and has threatened that women working for NGOs who enter Kohistan will be forcibly married.

Notes

Year of birth missing (living people)
Living people
Honour killing in Pakistan
Pakistani MNAs 2002–2007